The Government House Number 1 (Armenian: Հայաստանի Հանրապետության կառավարական տուն; Hayastani Hanrapetut'yan Karavarakan Tun) is located on Republic Square, Yerevan. 

It was designed by Alexander Tamanian, who was awarded the Soviet State Award in 1942 for this work. 

It is the official residence of the prime minister of Armenia.

See also 

 Government of Armenia
 National Assembly

References 

Buildings and structures in Yerevan
Official residences in Armenia